Law enforcement in Japan is provided mainly by prefectural police under the oversight of the National Police Agency. The National Police Agency is administered by the National Public Safety Commission, ensuring that Japan's police are an apolitical body and free of direct central government executive control. They are checked by an independent judiciary and monitored by a free and active press.

History

The Japanese government established a European-style civil police system in 1874, spearheaded by the efforts of statesman Kawaji Toshiyoshi, under the centralized control of the Police Bureau within the Home Ministry to put down internal disturbances and maintain order during the Meiji Restoration. By the 1880s, the police had developed into a nationwide instrument of government control, providing support for local leaders and enforcing public morality. They acted as general civil administrators, implementing official policies and thereby facilitating unification and modernization. In rural areas especially, the police had great authority and were accorded the same mixture of fear and respect as the village head. Their increasing involvement in political affairs was one of the foundations of the authoritarian state in Japan in the first half of the 20th century.

The centralized police system steadily acquired responsibilities, until it controlled almost all aspects of daily life, including fire prevention and mediation of labor disputes. The system regulated public health, business, factories, and construction, and it issued permits and licenses. The Peace Talk Law of 1925 gave police the authority to arrest people for "wrong thoughts". Special Higher Police (Tokko) were created to regulate the content of motion pictures, political meetings, and election campaigns. The Imperial Japanese Army's military police (Kenpeitai) and the Imperial Japanese Navy's Tokkeitai, operating under their respective services and the justice and home ministries aided the civilian police in limiting proscribed political activity. After the Manchurian Incident of 1931, military police assumed greater authority, leading to friction with their civilian counterparts. After 1937, police directed business activities for the war effort, mobilized labor, and controlled transportation, continuing throughout the rest of World War II.
After Japan's surrender in 1945, the Supreme Commander for the Allied Powers retained the prewar police structure, but viewed their organization as undemocratic. A new system was implemented after the Diet passed the 1947 Police Law. Contrary to Japanese proposals for a strong, centralized force to deal with postwar unrest, the police system was decentralized. About 1,600 independent municipal forces were established in cities, towns, and villages with 5,000 inhabitants or more, and a National Rural Police was organized by prefecture. Civilian control was to be ensured by placing the police under the jurisdiction of public safety commissions controlled by the National Public Safety Commission in the Office of the Prime Minister. The Home Ministry was abolished and replaced by the less powerful Ministry of Home Affairs, and the police were stripped of their responsibility for fire protection, public health, and other administrative duties.When most of the occupation forces were transferred to Korea in 1950–51 with the Korean War, the 75,000 strong National Police Reserve (predecessor of the Japan Ground Self-Defense Force) was formed outside the Regular police organizations to back up the ordinary police during civil disturbances. And pressure mounted for a centralized system more compatible with Japanese political preferences. The 1947 Police Law was amended in 1951 to allow the municipal police of smaller communities to merge with the National Rural Police. Most chose this arrangement, and by 1954 only about 400 cities, towns, and villages still had their own police forces. Under the 1954 amended Police Law, a final restructuring created an even more centralized system in which local forces were organized by prefectures under a National Police Agency.

The revised Police Law of 1954, still in effect in the 1990s, preserves some strong points of the postwar system, particularly measures ensuring civilian control and political neutrality, while allowing for increased centralization. The National Public Safety Commission system has been retained. State responsibility for maintaining public order has been clarified to include coordination of national and local efforts; centralization of police information, communications, and record keeping facilities; and national standards for training, uniforms, pay, rank, and promotion. Rural and municipal forces were abolished and integrated into prefectural forces, which handled basic police matters. Officials and inspectors in various ministries and agencies continue to exercise special police functions assigned to them in the 1947 Police Law.

Safety

According to statistics of the United Nations Office on Drugs and Crime, among the 192 member states of the UN, and among the countries reporting statistics of criminal and criminal justice, the incidence rate of violent crimes such as murder, abduction, rape, and robbery is very low in Japan.

The incarceration rate is very low and Japan ranks 209 out of 223 countries. It has an incarceration rate of 41 per 100,000 people. In 2018 the prison population was 51,805 and 10.8% of prisoners were unsentenced.

Japan has a very low rate of intentional homicide victims. According to the UNODC it ranks 219 out of 230 countries. It has a rate of just 0.20 per 100,000 inhabitants. There were 306 in 2017.

The number of firearm related deaths is low. The firearm-related death rate was 0.00 homicide (in 2008), 0.04 suicide (in 1999), 0.01 unintentional (in 1999) and 0.01 undetermined (in 1999) per 100,000 people. There's a gun ownership of 0.6 per 100 inhabitants.

The intentional death rate is low for homicides with 0.4 per 100,000 people in 2013. However, the suicide rate is relatively high with 21.7 per 100,000 in 2013.

Regular police organizations
Prefectural police are established for each prefecture and have full responsibility for regular police duties for their area of responsibility. These prefectural police are primarily municipal police with their own authority, but their activities are coordinated by the National Police Agency and the National Public Safety Commission. As of 2017, the total strength of police reached approximately 296,700 personnel, including 262,500 police officers, 900 Imperial Guards, and 33,200 civilian staff. Nationwide, there are approximately 23,400 female police officers and 13,000 female civilian staff.

National Police Agency

As the central coordinating body for the entire police system, the National Police Agency determines general standards and policies; detailed direction of operations is left to the lower echelons. In a national emergency or large-scale disaster, the agency is authorized to take command of prefectural police forces. In 1989, the agency was composed of about 1,100 national civil servants, empowered to collect information and to formulate and execute national policies. The agency is headed by a Commissioner General who is appointed by the National Public Safety Commission with the approval of the Prime Minister.

The Central Office includes the Secretariat, with divisions for general operations, planning, information, finance, management, and procurement and distribution of police equipment. The NPA operates five bureaus. Citizen oversight is provided by the National Public Safety Commission.

As of 2017, the NPA has a strength of 2,100 police officers, 900 Imperial Guards, and 4,800 civilian staff, for a total of 7,800 personnel.

Prefectural police

All operational police units are organized into prefectural police for each prefecture. Prefectural police are organized and commanded by their respective Prefectural Police Headquarters, and each one has a Prefectural Public Safety Commission and numerous operational units.

Shizuoka Prefectural Police).

The total strength of the prefectural police is 260,400 police officers and 28,400 civilian staff as of 2018, for a total of approximately 288,000 personnel.

Ranks
Police officers are divided into eleven ranks:

The NPA Commissioner General holds the highest position of the Japanese police. His title is not a rank, but rather denotes his position as head of the NPA. On the other hand, the MPD Superintendent General represents not only the highest rank in the system but also assignment as head of the Tokyo Metropolitan Police Department.

Designation and dismissal of these high-rank officers are delegated to National Public Safety Commission.

The superintendent general which is highest police rank is only in Tokyo outside of it senior commissioner is the highest rank and chief outside of Tokyo, Prefecture police headquarters are commanded by Chief or Director General (hunbocho).

Other public security officers 
There are several thousands of public security officials attached to various agencies. They are responsible for such matters as forest preservation, narcotics control, fishery inspection, and enforcement of regulations on maritime, labor, and mine safety.

Special judicial police officials

National Police Agency

Ministry of Justice

Ministry of Health, Labour and Welfare

Ministry of Agriculture, Forestry and Fisheries

Ministry of Land, Infrastructure, Transport and Tourism

()

Ministry of Defense

Officials working for public safety, except for Special judicial police officials
There are other officers having limited public safety functions.

The National Diet

Ministry of Justice

Ministry of Finance

Ministry of Health, Labour and Welfare

Ministry of Agriculture, Forestry and Fisheries

Tables

Laws and regulations for restricted materials

Firearm and weapon policy
The Firearm and Sword Possession Control Law of 1958 strictly regulates the civilian ownership of guns, swords and other weaponry. The law states that "No person shall possess a firearm or firearms or a sword or swords" and there are few exceptions.

Medical and recreational drugs policy
Japan has strict regulations on medical and recreational drugs. Importing or using any type of narcotics is illegal and there is generally no leniency; for example, the possession of cannabis has a jail sentence of up to five years for the first offense. There are no exceptions for celebrities either, both in law enforcement and in Japanese society; if a celebrity is arrested, it could potentially end their career. Authorities can detain a suspect for up to three weeks without charges. Solitary confinement is common and imprisoned suspects only get access to a lawyer. It is illegal to mail prescription drugs, and only designated parties in Japan are allowed to import them. If someone intends to bring more than one month of prescription medication, cosmetics, or medical devices into Japan, they are required to obtain import certification called yakkan shoumei (薬監証明).

Historical secret police organizations
Tokko (Investigated and controlled political groups and ideologies deemed to be a threat to public order)
Kempeitai (Military Police of the Imperial Japanese Army)
Tokkeitai (Military Police of the Imperial Japanese Navy)

See also

Shinsengumi, a special police force of the late shogunate period

References

Books 
 Yoshino, Jun. (2005). "Law Enforcement in the Edo Period". In: Japan Echo, vol. 31 n. 3, June 2005. p. 59-62.

External links
 NPA Official Site (Japanese)
 NPA Official Site (English)
 Imperial Guard Headquarters
Regional Bureaus
 Kanto Regional Police Bureau 	
 Chubu Regional Police Bureau 	
 Kinki Regional Police Bureau 	
 Chugoku Regional Police Bureau 	
 Shikoku Regional Police Bureau 	
 Kyushu Regional Police Bureau
Police communications Bureaus
 Hokkaido
 Tokyo
Kobans
 Pictures